Maksym Stankevych (born 29 March 1982) is a Ukrainian retired footballer.

Career
He began to play football at RVUFK (Kiev), which he graduated in 1999. The first coaches were Sivanyuk Vladimir Nikolaevich and Yashkov Vladimir Evgenievich. He made his professional football debut in 2001 in the Chornomorets-2 Odesa.

In the Ukrainian Premier League, they played 3 matches, playing as part of the Naftovyk Okhtyrka team. He made his debut on 21 July 2007 in the game against Shakhtar Donetsk. I spent only six months in Akhtyrka.

The main part of his career was spent in the Ukrainian First League, where Davydov spent more than 200 matches.

He played in the teams CSKA Kyiv, Desna Chernihiv, Zirka Kropyvnytskyi, Mykolaiv. In January 2013 he became a player at Sumy. Since 2015 he has been playing for Dnipro Cherkasy. In April 2019, by decision of the FFU FFU, he was suspended for life from any activity, including participation in the organization of match fixing.

References

External links 
 
 Oleh Davydov allplayers.in.ua
 
 

1982 births
Living people
Footballers from Nizhyn
Ukrainian footballers
Ukrainian Premier League players
Ukrainian First League players
Ukrainian Second League players
Ukrainian expatriate sportspeople in Belarus
Expatriate footballers in Belarus
Association football defenders
FC Desna Chernihiv players
FC Desna-2 Chernihiv players
FC Osipovichi players
FC Chornomorets-2 Odesa players
FC Polissya Zhytomyr players
FC CSKA Kyiv players
FC Sevastopol players
FC Naftovyk-Ukrnafta Okhtyrka players
FC Zirka Kropyvnytskyi players
MFC Mykolaiv players
PFC Sumy players
FC Cherkashchyna players